Nilssen is a surname of Norwegian origin. The name may refer to:

Asbjørn Nilssen (1875–1958), Norwegian Nordic skier
Åse Wisløff Nilssen (born 1945), Norwegian politician; served two terms in the Storting
Magnus Nilssen (1871–1947), Norwegian politician; Minister of Labor 1928
Paal Nilssen-Love (born 1974), Norwegian jazz drummer
Rolf Nilssen (1928–2012), Norwegian politician; served three terms in the Storting
Rune Nilssen (born 1975), Norwegian professional football player

Norwegian-language surnames
Patronymic surnames